Cedar Hall may refer to:

Cedar Hall, Maryland
Cedar Hall, an alternative name for Hillcrest
Cedar Hall, a gilded age mansion in Hampton, Virginia built by seafood magnate James Sands Darling in 1906.

See also
Cedar (disambiguation)